Jazz Giant is an album by saxophonist Benny Carter that was recorded in 1957 and 1958 and released by Contemporary Records.

Reception

At Allmusic, Scott Yanow called the album a "particularly strong septet session" and stated, "This timeless music is beyond the simple categories of 'swing' or 'bop' and should just be called 'classic.'" The Penguin Guide to Jazz wrote that the album "is a terrific small-group record, full of imagination and invention, and the interchanges with Webster are classic".

Track listing
 "Old Fashioned Love" (James P. Johnson, Cecil Mack) - 7:51
 "I'm Coming Virginia" (Will Marion Cook, Donald Heywood) - 5:48
 "A Walkin' Thing" (Carter) - 6:00
 "Blue Lou" (Irving Mills, Edgar Sampson) - 4:58
 "Ain't She Sweet" (Milton Ager, Jack Yellen) - 3:40
 "How Can You Lose" (Carter) - 6:13
 "Blues My Naughty Sweetie Gives to Me" (Charles McCarron, Russ Morgan, Arthur Swanstrom) - 4:39

Personnel
 Benny Carter – alto saxophone, trumpet, arrangements
 Frank Rosolino – trombone (tracks 1–4 & 6)
 Ben Webster – tenor saxophone (tracks 1–4 & 6)
 André Previn (tracks 1 & 4–7) – piano
 Jimmy Rowles (tracks 2 & 3) – piano
 Barney Kessel – guitar
 Leroy Vinnegar – double bass
 Shelly Manne – drums

References

Contemporary Records albums
Benny Carter albums
1958 albums